The 2011–12 EHF Cup was the 31st edition of the EHF Cup. Frisch Auf Göppingen, who were the defending champions, won the title for the second consecutive season, beating Dunkerque HB in the final.

Knockout stage

Round 1

|}

Round 2

|}

Round 3

|}

Round 4

|}

Quarterfinals

|}

Semifinals

|}

Finals

|}

External links 
 EHF Cup website
 EHF Cup 2011-12 edition

References 

EHF Cup seasons
Cup
Cup